The Agricultural Holdings (England) Act 1883 (46 & 47 Vict. c. 61) was an Act of the Parliament of the United Kingdom passed by William Ewart Gladstone's Liberal government.

The Agricultural Holdings (England) Act 1875 had provided a list of improvements for whose unexhausted value a departing tenant farmer could claim compensation from the landlord. However, compensation was not compulsory and so many landlords contracted out of the Act's provisions. The 1883 Act made compensation for the tenants' improvements compulsory and according to F. M. L. Thompson "marked for the first time the compulsory intervention of the law in the supposedly voluntarily bargains made between tenants and landlord".
The Act came into force in 1885.

Notes

United Kingdom Acts of Parliament 1883
Agriculture legislation in the United Kingdom